Whiptail can refer to:
 Fish:
 A common name for Blue grenadier, a species of fish in the genus Macruronus
 Whiptail catfish, a common name for the genus of fish Rineloricaria
 A wide variety of long-tailed, New World lizard species from several genera in the Teiidae family; also known as racerunners and jungle runners.
Ameiva - jungle runners
Aspidoscelis - northern whiptails
Cnemidophorus - southern whiptails
Kentropyx - spurred whiptails
 Whiptail (company), a company that builds solid-state data storage systems 
 Whiptail (plant disorder)
 Whiptail (comics), a series of recurring adversaries in the comic book series Dynamo 5
Whiptail (software), in Unix-like shell scripting, a dialog replacement using Newt instead of ncurses
 California City Whiptails, a professional baseball team

Animal common name disambiguation pages